Deputy Chief of the Air Staff (DCAS) refers to several principal staff officers of the Pakistan Air Force (PAF), reporting under the Vice Chief of the Air Staff. , PAF lists the following positions:
 Deputy Chief of the Air Staff (Operations) – DCAS(O)
 Deputy Chief of the Air Staff (Engineering) – DCAS(E)
 Deputy Chief of the Air Staff (Administration) – DCAS(A)
 Deputy Chief of the Air Staff (Training) – DCAS(T)
 Deputy Chief of the Air Staff (Personnel) – DCAS(P)
 Deputy Chief of the Air Staff (Support) – DCAS(S)

See also
 Deputy Chief of Air Force (Australia)
 Deputy Chief of the Air Staff (India)
 Deputy Chief of the Air Staff (United Kingdom)

References

External links
 Pakistan Air Force (Official website)

Pakistan Air Force
Pakistan Air Force appointments